Blīdene Station is a railway station on Latvia's Jelgava – Liepāja Railway.

References 

Railway stations in Latvia
Railway stations opened in 1927
Railway stations closed in 2001